General Rzayev may refer to:

Dadash Rzayev (born 1935), Azerbaijani Armed Forces major general
Rail Rzayev (1945–2009), Azerbaijani Air Force general
Zaur Rzayev (1958–2010), Azerbaijani Armed Forces major general